Andrés Alejandro Vilches Araneda (born 14 January 1992), nicknamed Andy, is a Chilean footballer who plays as forward for Ñublense.

International career
Vilches got his first call up to the senior Chile squad for a friendly against the United States in January 2015 and made his international debut in the match.

Personal life
His older brother, Eduardo, is also a professional footballer.

Honours

Player
Huachipato
 Primera División de Chile (1): 2012 Clausura

Colo-Colo
Primera División (2): 2015–A, 2017–T
Copa Chile (1): 2016
Supercopa de Chile (1): 2017

Universidad Católica
 Primera División de Chile (1): 2018

References

External links
 Soccerway profile

1992 births
Living people
Footballers from Santiago
Chilean footballers
Chile international footballers
Colo-Colo footballers
C.D. Huachipato footballers
A.C. Barnechea footballers
Deportes Valdivia footballers
Club Deportivo Universidad Católica footballers
Chilean Primera División players
Primera B de Chile players
Segunda División Profesional de Chile players
Association football forwards